Josef Meusburger is an Austrian para-alpine skier.

Career  

Meusburger represented Austria at the 1976, 1980, 1984 and 1988 Winter Paralympics. He won a medal in each event that he competed in at the 1976, 1980 and 1984 Winter Paralympics. At the 1988 Winter Paralympics, he won one gold medal. In total, he won six gold medals and two silver medals at the Winter Paralympics.

He also competed at the Men's giant slalom for above-knee amputees event at disabled skiing, a demonstration sport during the 1984 Winter Olympics.

Achievements

See also 

 List of Paralympic medalists in alpine skiing

References

External links 
 

Living people
Year of birth missing (living people)
Paralympic alpine skiers of Austria
Alpine skiers at the 1976 Winter Paralympics
Alpine skiers at the 1980 Winter Paralympics
Alpine skiers at the 1984 Winter Paralympics
Alpine skiers at the 1988 Winter Paralympics
Medalists at the 1976 Winter Paralympics
Medalists at the 1980 Winter Paralympics
Medalists at the 1984 Winter Paralympics
Medalists at the 1988 Winter Paralympics
Paralympic gold medalists for Austria
Paralympic silver medalists for Austria
Place of birth missing (living people)
Paralympic medalists in alpine skiing
Austrian amputees
20th-century Austrian people